Douglas Hollow is a tributary of North Branch Mehoopany Creek in Wyoming County, Pennsylvania, in the United States. The stream is classified as a Coldwater Fishery and is inhabited by four fish species, including wild brook trout. Its entire length is within  of a road and it flows through a mixture of forested and agricultural land.

Course
Douglas Hollow begins in a valley between Douglas Hill and Oak Ridge in North Branch Township. The stream passes through a small unnamed pond and flows south for several tenths of a mile before turning south-southeast for several tenths of a mile. It then turns south and crosses Pennsylvania Route 87 before reaching its confluence with North Branch Mehoopany Creek.

Hydrology
Douglas Hollow is not designated as an impaired waterbody.

Geography and geology

Douglas Hollow is a high-gradient stream that flows in a generally southerly direction.

Watershed
The stream is entirely within the United States Geological Survey quadrangle of Jenningsville. It joins North Branch Mehoopany Creek near Lovelton.

Douglas Hollow flows through a mix of forested and agricultural lands. The non-forested land is mostly in the middle and upper reaches of the watershed. A total of 55 percent of the stream's length is within  of a road, while all of it is within  of one. The population density of the stream's watershed was 3 people per square kilometer (8 per square mile) in 2000, putting it in a multi-way tie for the least densely populated sub-watershed of North Branch Mehoopany Creek.

History
The valley of Douglas Hollow was entered into the Geographic Names Information System on August 2, 1979. Its identifier in the Geographic Names Information System is 1173421. The stream has no official name and instead takes its name from the valley through which it flows. It is also known as Douglas Hollow Brook.

Pennsylvania Fish and Boat Commission biologists performed a fish sampling and other studies on the streams in the North Branch Mehoopany Creek watershed, including one site on Douglas Hollow, in 2001. The stream was added to the Pennsylvania Fish and Boat Commission's list of wild trout streams in 2013.

Biology
Wild trout naturally reproduce in Douglas Hollow from its headwaters downstream to its mouth. However, in 2001, these wild brook trout populations were noted to be sparse. The low trout populations were primarily due to difficulty for fish to physically access the stream.

In addition to brook trout, three other fish species were observed in the lower reaches of Douglas Hollow: blacknose dace, creek chub, and sculpins.

Douglas Hollow is classified as a Coldwater Fishery.

See also
Farr Hollow, next tributary of North Branch Mehoopany Creek going downstream
Burgess Brook, next tributary of North Branch Mehoopany Creek going upstream
List of rivers of Pennsylvania

References

Tributaries of North Branch Mehoopany Creek